Eran Rabani (Hebrew: ערן רבני) is an Israeli theoretical chemist. He is a Professor of Chemistry at the University of California, Berkeley, holding the Glenn T. Seaborg Chair in Physical Chemistry, and at the Tel Aviv University. Rabani serves as the director of The Sackler Center for Computational Molecular and Materials Science, and as a faculty scientist at the Lawrence Berkeley National Laboratory.

Education 
Rabani received his B.Sc. in chemistry from the Hebrew University of Jerusalem in 1991. Under the supervision of Raphael David Levine, Rabani studied molecular Rydberg states, completing his PhD. in 1996. Having completed his post-doctoral fellowship at Columbia University in 1999 he joined the faculty of the School of Chemistry at the Tel Aviv University.

Career 
Rabani's interest in the theory of nanomaterials rose during his post-doctoral stay in the group of Bruce J. Berne at Columbia University, studying the electronic properties of cadmium selenide nanocrystals. This work included the first application of the filter-diagonalization method for the study of electronic structure, as well as the first quantitative study interactions between nanocrystals. Later early work in Rabani's independent career included further the study of the latter, the highlight of which is the theoretical study of drying-induced self-assembly of nanocrystals.

Starting in 2012, Rabani has been working extensively with Roi Baer (Hebrew University of Jerusalem) and Daniel Neuhauser (University of California, Los Angeles) on applying stochastic methods for the study of the electronic structure of large systems, such as nanocrystals, including stochastic formulations of the random-phase approximation, second order Møller–Plesset perturbation theory and density functional theory. Such methods have allowed the calculation of GW self-energies of 10,000 electrons-large systems with linear scaling.

Rabani became a full professor at Tel Aviv University in 2008. In 2014 he joined the faculty of the department of chemistry at University of California, Berkeley and later the faculty of the Lawrence Berkeley National Laboratory in 2015. Rabani has held various positions, including serving as the Vice President for Research and Development at Tel Aviv University, where today he is the director of The Sackler Center for Computational Molecular and Materials Science. In 2015 Rabani joined the editorial board of the American Chemical Society journal Nano Letters as an associate editor.

Rabani has an h-index of 47 as of 2020, having published more than 230 papers which were cited more than 8600 times.

Awards 
 Visiting Miller Research Professorship, University of California, Berkeley 2010
 Marie Curie IOF, 2010 - 2013
 J.T. Oden Faculty Fellow, University of Texas, Austin 2009
 Invited Professorship, Ecole Normale Superieure, Paris 2008 - 2009
 The Michael Bruno memorial award, Yad Hanadiv, 2006
 ICS Prize for Excellent Young Chemists, Israel Chemical Society, 2003
 The Friedenberg Foundation Award, Israel Science Foundation, 2002
 The Bergmann Memorial Research Award, United States-Israel Binational Science Foundation, 2000
 The Yigal Alon Fellowship, The Israeli Council of Higher Education, 1999 - 2002
 The Fulbright Postdoctoral Fellowship, 1997
 The Rothschild Postdoctoral Fellowship, Yad Hanadiv, 1996

Community activity 
Rabani served as a council member and the vice mayor of Har Adar between the years 2008-2010.

References 

Israeli chemists
Hebrew University of Jerusalem alumni
Israeli nanotechnologists
Jewish scientists
Living people
Jewish chemists
1967 births
Academic staff of Tel Aviv University
Theoretical chemists
UC Berkeley College of Chemistry faculty